Martin Mill railway station serves the small village of Martin Mill in East Kent. The station and all trains serving it are operated by Southeastern. The booking office is open only on weekday mornings however a ticket machine (card only) on the Dover-bound platform caters for out-of-hours ticketing. For many years the ticket office acted as a Post Office for the local community.

Services
All services at Martin Mill are operated by Southeastern using  and  EMUs.

The typical off-peak service in trains per hour is:
 1 tph to London St Pancras International
 1 tph to 

During the peak hours, the station is also served by a number of services between Ramsgate and London Charing Cross via .

History
The line was the only one jointly owned by the rival South Eastern Railway and London, Chatham and Dover Railway and remained independent until the Grouping. The line has been described as one of the more spectacular in southern England with Martin Mill at the apex on a 400-foot-high plateau.

The station was built with two platforms either side of a double track, a signal box was located to the south with a goods yard to the south east. The goods yard could handle most types of goods including live stock and it was equipped with a 10-ton crane.

The station was host to a Southern Railway camping coach from 1938 to 1939. Two camping coaches were positioned here by the Southern Region from 1954 to 1959, then three coaches in 1960 and 1961 then they were replaced by three Pullman camping coaches from 1962 to 1967.

Military history

Martin Mill also served as an important station during both the First and Second World Wars. During the construction of Dover Harbour in 1897 a single track branch was constructed to bring in materials from Martin Mill. The track ran over the surface of the high chalk plateau parallel with the Dover-Deal main line, before climbing up to the summit just at the entrance to Guston tunnel. From there, it ascended to the cliff top, 350 ft above sea level. It then descended in a zig-zag formation on a vertiginous shelf which was cut into the cliff, leading down to the eastern part of the harbour. The route was reopened during both wars, and operated mainly by Royal Engineers to deploy mounted artillery on the cliff edge. During the Second World War, the branch served the many gun batteries along the white cliffs between Dover and St Margarets including the two 14 inch guns/cannons nicknamed Winnie (after Winston Churchill) and Pooh (after the fictional bear). The military railway was also used by three railway guns, Gladiator, Sceneshifter, and Piecemaker which were WW1 railway gun carriages bearing their original gun names but carrying 13.5" naval guns. There were three curved firing spurs on the military railway designed for use by the rail guns. During the war the batteries controlled the Dover Straits, but the larger guns fired into France, mainly at the numerous German gun batteries who were shelling the Dover area from August 1940.

This line also ran down to Dover Harbour along a cliff road.

References

External links

Dover District
Railway stations in Kent
DfT Category E stations
Former Dover and Deal Joint Railway stations
Railway stations in Great Britain opened in 1881
Railway stations served by Southeastern
1881 establishments in England